Commonwealth Parliament may refer to 
 Parliament of Australia, the federal parliament of the Commonwealth of Australia, as opposed to the parliaments of the Australian states 
 Commonwealth Parliament (England), during the Commonwealth of the 1650s
 Sejm of the Polish–Lithuanian Commonwealth

See also
 Commonwealth
 Parliament
 Commonwealth Youth Parliament of the Commonwealth of Nations
 Commonwealth Heads of Government Meeting of the Commonwealth of Nations
 CIS Interparliamentary Assembly of the Commonwealth of Independent States
 Commonwealth of Catalonia 1914–1925 deliberative assembly
 Parliament of the United Kingdom, often called the "Imperial Parliament" of the British Empire, predecessor of the Commonwealth of Nations